Albert William Tucker (28 November 1905 – 25 January 1995) was a Canadian mathematician who made important contributions in topology, game theory, and non-linear programming.

Early life and education
Albert Tucker was born in Oshawa, Ontario, Canada, and earned his B.A. at the University of Toronto in 1928 and his M.A. at the same institution in 1929. In 1932, he earned his Ph.D. at Princeton University under the supervision of Solomon Lefschetz, with a dissertation entitled An Abstract Approach to Manifolds.  In 1932–33 he was a National Research Fellow at Cambridge, Harvard, and then University of Chicago.

Career
Tucker then returned to Princeton to join the faculty in 1933, where he stayed until 1974. He chaired the mathematics department for about twenty years, one of the longest tenures. His extensive relationships within the field made him a great source for oral histories of the mathematics community.

In 1950, Albert Tucker gave the name and interpretation "prisoner's dilemma" to Merrill M. Flood and Melvin Dresher's model of cooperation and conflict, resulting in the most well-known game theoretic paradox. He is also well known for the Karush–Kuhn–Tucker conditions, a basic result in non-linear programming, which was published in conference proceedings, rather than in a journal.

In the 1960s, he was heavily involved in mathematics education, as chair of the AP Calculus committee for the College Board (1960–1963), through work with the Committee on the Undergraduate Program in Mathematics (CUPM) of the MAA (he was president of the MAA in 1961–1962), and through many NSF summer workshops for high school and college teachers.  George B. Thomas Jr. acknowledged Tucker's contribution of many exercises to Thomas's classic textbook, Calculus and Analytic Geometry.

In the early 1980s, Tucker recruited Princeton history professor Charles Coulston Gillispie to help him set up an oral history project to preserve stories about the Princeton mathematical community in the 1930s. With funding from the Sloan Foundation, this project later expanded its scope. Among those who shared their memories of such figures as Einstein, von Neumann, and Gödel were computer pioneer Herman Goldstine and Nobel laureates John Bardeen and Eugene Wigner.

Students and legacy
Tucker's Ph.D. students include Michel Balinski, David Gale, Alan J. Goldman, John Isbell, Stephen Maurer, Turing Award winner Marvin Minsky, Nobel Prize winner John Nash, Torrence Parsons, Nobel Prize winner Lloyd Shapley, Robert Singleton, and Marjorie Stein. Tucker advised and collaborated with Harold W. Kuhn on a number of papers and mathematical models.

Tucker noticed the leadership ability and talent of a young mathematics graduate student named John G. Kemeny, whose hiring Tucker suggested to Dartmouth College. Following Tucker's advice, Dartmouth recruited Kemeny, who became Chair of the Mathematics Department and later College President. Years later, Dartmouth College recognized Albert Tucker with an honorary degree.

Tucker died in Hightstown, N.J. in 1995 at age 89. His sons, Alan Tucker and Thomas W. Tucker, and his grandson Thomas J. Tucker are all also professional mathematicians.

Tucker Prize
At each (triennial) International Symposium of the Mathematical Optimization Society (MOS) the Tucker Prize, in honour of A. W. Tucker, is given for outstanding thesis in the area of discrete mathematics.

Works
 with H. W. Kuhn (eds.): Contributions to the theory of games, Annals of Mathematical Studies 1950
 with H. W. Kuhn (eds.): Linear inequalities and related systems, Annals of Mathematical Studies 1956
 with Allan Gewirtz, Harry Sitomer: Constructive linear algebra, Englewood Cliffs 1974
 with Evar Nering: Linear Programs and related problems, Academic Press 1993

References

Further reading

External links 

 News from PRINCETON UNIVERSITY
 
 A Guide to Albert William Tucker Papers
 Extract from an obituary
 Kuhn-Tucker conditions
 The Princeton Mathematics Community in the 1930s An oral history project initiated by Tucker, also contains a series of interviews with Tucker.
 Oral History Interview with Albert W. Tucker, Charles Babbage Institute, University of Minnesota.
 Biography of Albert W. Tucker from the Institute for Operations Research and the Management Sciences

1905 births
1995 deaths
20th-century Canadian mathematicians
Topologists
Game theorists
University of Toronto alumni
Harvard University staff
University of Chicago people
John von Neumann Theory Prize winners
People from Oshawa
Princeton University alumni
Princeton University faculty
Presidents of the Mathematical Association of America
Canadian emigrants to the United States
Oral history